Johny Anfone (October 28, 1969) is a Thai actor, host, singer and politician. He is a former member of a Thai string combo band, GRAND EX. His best known international work is portraiting Lord Worawongsa in the 2001 Thai epic film The Legend of Suriyothai.

Early life 
Anfone was born in Thailand to a Filipino musician, Rene Anfone, and a Thai German mother, Laongtip Puboon. He graduated from Assumption College Sriracha.

Career

Entertainment career
At the age of 15, Anfone was discovered by Nakoran Vejsupaporn (a guitarist and the leader of the band "GRAND EX"), while he was studying in Saint Dominic School, Bangkok. Vejsupaporn learned of Anfone's talents and offered him a spot in his band. Anfone served as a keyboardist and a backing vocalist of the band for three years, assisting with the release of one of the albums, Khuatlo.

He then joined Kantana, a popular film and television company in Thailand, to act in his first drama, Miti Muet. Since then, he's made appearances in more than 60 other dramas and movies.

Political career
During 2013–14, he took part in protests against the Yingluck Shinawatra government with the People's Democratic Reform Committee (PDRC), or Whistleblower.

In 2022, before the governor's election Bangkok that will happen soon. He became a member of the Thai Sang Thai Party, a newly political party formed by Sudarat Keyuraphan along with an apology for joining the protests in the past.

Personal life 
He married Jariya Anfone. The couple has a son and two daughters: Jirayu (James), Jompak (Jamie), and Jarichaya (Jeans).

Works

Host 

Loi Lueng Kreng Padub
Game Lakon Pisana
Bubpayalawad
Buddy Game
168 Hours
Natee Chukchen
The Eyes

Music Video 

Oye oye (1988)

References 

Johnny Anfone
Johnny Anfone
Johnny Anfone
Living people
1969 births
Johnny Anfone
Johnny Anfone
Johnny Anfone
Johnny Anfone
Johnny Anfone